Martin Damm and Radek Štěpánek were the defending champions but they competed with different partners that year, Damm with Cyril Suk and Štěpánek with Jiří Novák.

Damm and Suk lost in the first round to Simon Aspelin and Andrei Olhovskiy.

Novák and Štěpánek lost in the final 6–4, 6–3 against Joshua Eagle and Sandon Stolle.

Seeds

  Bob Bryan /  Mike Bryan (first round)
  Martin Damm /  Cyril Suk (first round)
  Joshua Eagle /  Sandon Stolle (champions)
  Jiří Novák /  Radek Štěpánek (final)

Draw

External links
 2002 CA-TennisTrophy Doubles draw

Vienna Open
2002 ATP Tour
2002 in Austrian tennis